Male and Female, is a 1919 silent film directed by Cecil B. DeMille

Male and Female may also refer to:

 Male and Female: A Study of the Sexes in a Changing World, a 1949 book by Margaret Mead

See also
 
 Sex, male and female collectively
 Gender, male and female collectively
 Hermaphrodite, both male and female
 Intersex, both male and female
 Dioecious, having both male and female, instead of one or the other or neither
 Male
 Female
 Gender of connectors and fasteners
 XY sex-determination system
 Male (disambiguation)
 Female (disambiguation)